Gil Gavbara, also known as Gavbarih (the Cow Devotee), was king and founder of the Dabuyid dynasty in 642, ruling until his death in 660.

Origins
According to Ibn Isfandiyar, the Dabuyids were descended from Djamasp, a brother of the Sassanid shah Kavadh I. Gil Gavbara was the grandson of Piruz, who is described as brave as the Iranian mythological hero Rostam. Piruz later became the ruler of Gilan, and married a local princess who bore him a son named Gilanshah, who in turn had a son, Gil Gavbara.

Biography 
Piruz died around 642 and was succeeded by Gil Gavbara as the ruler of Gilan. Gil Gavbara, together with Farrukhzad from the House of Ispahbudhan,  signed a peace treaty with the Arab conquerors and was given control of Tabaristan, which led to the formal conferment of the titles of Gil-Gilan ("ruler of Gilan") and Padashwargarshah ("Shah of Patashwargar", the old name of Tabaristan's mountains) to Gil Gavbara's son Dabuya by Yazdegerd III, the last Sasanian shah.

References

Sources 
 
 
 
 

660 deaths
7th-century rulers in Asia
Year of birth unknown
Dabuyid dynasty
7th-century Iranian people
Vassal rulers of the Sasanian Empire
Governors of the Sasanian Empire
Rulers of Tabaristan